Miriam Tlali (11 November 1933 – 24 February 2017) was a South African novelist. She was the first black woman in South Africa to publish an English-language novel, Between Two Worlds, in 1975. She was also one of the first to write about Soweto. Most of her writing was originally banned by the South African apartheid regime.

Life and work
Miriam Masoli Tlali was born in Doornfontein, Johannesburg, and grew up in Sophiatown. She attended St Cyprian's Anglican School and then Madibane High School. She studied at the University of the Witwatersrand until it was closed to Blacks during the apartheid era; she later went to the National University of Lesotho (then called Pius the XII University) at Roma, Lesotho. Leaving there because of lack of funds, she went to secretarial school and found employment as a bookkeeper at a Johannesburg furniture store.

Tlali drew on her experiences as an office clerk for her first book, Muriel at Metropolitan, a semi-autobiographical novel whose "viewpoint is a new one in South African literature". Although written in 1969, it was not published for six years, being rejected by many publishing houses in South Africa. In 1975 Ravan Press published Muriel at Metropolitan: "only after removing certain extracts they thought would certainly offend the Censorship Board — the South African literary watchdog. But despite this effort, the novel was banned almost immediately after publication because the Censorship Board pronounced it undesirable in the South African political context." The book reached a wider audience after its publication in 1979 by Longman under the title Between Two Worlds, and its subsequent translation into other languages, including Japanese, Polish, German and Dutch. In 1988, Tlali said in a paper delivered in Amsterdam before the Committee Against Censorship: "To the Philistines, the banners of books, the critics.... We black South African writers (who are faced with the task of conscientizing our people and ourselves are writing for those whom we know are the relevant audience. We are not going to write in order to qualify into your definition of what you describe as 'true art'.... Our duty is to write for our people and about them."

Her second novel, Amandla, which was based on the 1976 Soweto uprising, was also banned in South Africa soon after it was published in 1980. Later books by Tlali include Mihloti (meaning "Tears"), a collection of short stories, interviews and non-fiction, published in 1984 by the black publishing house Skotaville, which she co-founded. Her novels were unbanned in 1986. Her 1989 book Footprints in the Quag, published in South Africa by David Philip, was brought out under the title Soweto Stories by Pandora Press.

Tlali co-founded and contributed to Staffrider magazine, for which she wrote a regular column, "Soweto Speaking", as well as writing for other South African publications, including the Rand Daily Mail.

Tlali's literary activities took her to different parts of the world, including the Netherlands, where she worked for a year, and the USA. In 1978, she participated in an international writing programme at Iowa State University, giving lectures in San Francisco, Atlanta, Washington DC, and New York, and between 1989 and 1990 was a visiting scholar at the Southern African Research Program at Yale University.

Awards and honours
In 1995, Tlali was honoured by the South African government's Department of Arts, Culture, Science and Technology with a Literary Lifetime Achievement Award. In 2008, she received the Ikhamanga Silver presidential award.

On 11 November 2018, Google recognized her with a doodle.

Selected bibliography
 Between Two Worlds, Johannesburg: Ravan Press, 1975. Longman, 1979.
 Amandla, South Africa: Vivlia Publishers, 1980, .
 Mihloti, Johannesburg: Skotaville, 1984.
 Footprints in the Quag, David Philip Publishers, 1989, . As Soweto Stories, London: Pandora, 1989.

Further reading

Bernth Linfors and Reinhard Sander, Twentieth-Century Caribbean and Black African Writers, Detroit: Gale Research, 1996.
Derek Attridge and Rosemary Jane Jolly, Writing South Africa: Literature, Apartheid and Democracy 1970 – 1995, Cambridge (UK) and New York: Cambridge University Press, 1998.
Christina Cullhed, Grappling with Patriarchies: Narrative Strategies of Resistance in Miriam Tlali's Writings. Doctoral dissertation, 2006. Published by Uppsala University.
Sarah Nuttall, "Literature and the Archive: The Biography of Texts", in Carolyn Hamilton (ed.), Refiguring the Archive, Cape Town: David Philip, 2002.

References

1933 births
2017 deaths
20th-century South African novelists
20th-century women writers
International Writing Program alumni
People from Johannesburg
Recipients of the Order of Ikhamanga
South African women novelists
University of the Witwatersrand alumni